Culebratherium is an extinct genus of dugongid sirenian mammal which existed in what is now Panama during the Early Miocene. It takes its name from the upper member of the Culebra Formation of the Panama Canal Zone, in which the holotype fossil was found.

References

Bibliography 
 

Miocene sirenians
Burdigalian life
Miocene mammals of North America
Hemingfordian
Neogene Panama
Fossils of Panama
Fossil taxa described in 2019
Prehistoric placental genera